Arthropodium is a genus of herbaceous perennial plants in the subfamily Lomandroideae of the family Asparagaceae. It is native to Australia, New Zealand, New Caledonia and Madagascar.

The rhizomes of some species can be eaten as root vegetables, including A. cirratum, A. milleflorum, A. minus, and A. strictum.

A. cirratum is native to New Zealand, where it may once have been farmed.  It is used for medicine as well as food, and has symbolic importance in traditional Māori culture.

Species recognised as of July 2014:
 
Arthropodium bifurcatum Heenan, A.D.Mitch. & de Lange - New Zealand North Island
Arthropodium caesioides H.Perrier - Madagascar
Arthropodium candidum Raoul - New Zealand North and South Islands
 Arthropodium cirratum (G.Forst.) R.Br. - rengarenga, renga lily, New Zealand rock lily, or maikaika - New Zealand North and South Islands
Arthropodium curvipes S.Moore - Western Australia
Arthropodium dyeri (Domin) Brittan - Western Australia
Arthropodium milleflorum (Redouté) J.F.Macbr. - pale vanilla lily - New South Wales, Victoria, South Australia, Tasmania
Arthropodium minus R.Br. - small vanilla lily - New South Wales, Victoria, South Australia, Tasmania
Arthropodium neocaledonicum Baker - New Caledonia

Formerly included

Arthropodium fimbriatum R.Br. – see Dichopogon fimbriatus
Arthropodium strictum R.Br. - chocolate lily  – see Dichopogon strictus

See also
 List of plants known as lily

References

External links 

 Significance of A. cirratum in Maori culture
 Plants for a Future database on A. milleflorum
 Photograph of underground parts of A. milleflorum

 
Root vegetables
Asparagaceae genera